Tara HD was a Malaysian Hindi-language pay-television channel, owned by satellite provider Astro.

It offered Bollywood movies and Indian-made programming, including television productions from Colors TV, StarPlus, Life OK, Sony Entertainment Television, Colors Infinity, Star World India, FYI TV18, Zoom, NDTV Good Times, Food Food TV, Big Magic, MTV India, Living Foodz and Zee TV.

The channel was launched on 19 October 2016, replacing Zee Variasi, and broadcast movies and programs with optional Malay and English subtitles. The channel ended its broadcast on 1 October 2019 and was replaced by Colors HD on the same channel number.

After Tara HD's closure, selected serials such as Shakti and discontinued shows (such as Court Room - Sachchai Hazir Ho and Madhubala - Ek Ishq Ek Junoon) from Colors Hindi remained on new channel Colors HD. Tujhse Hai Raabta, Ye Hai Mohabbatein, Kasautii Zindagii Kay, Crime Patrol Dial 100, Nazar, Qayamat Ki Raat and pre-Tara HD original shows moved to another sister channel, Astro Bollyone HD.

Last aired 

 Chakravartin Ashoka Samrat
 Ishqbaaz 
 Shakti 
 Tujhse Hai Raabta
 Ye Hai Mohabbatein 
Kasautii Zindagii Kay
 Ishq Mein Marjawan 
Crime Patrol Dial 100 
Nazar
By Invite Only
I Want To Bake Free
Qayamat Ki Raat
E-Town News
Planet Bollywood
B-Town Jazz
Filimistaan
Weekend Buzz
Dreams Unplugged
Filmi Style Check
Bollywood Buzz
Pushplay
Music Block
Bollywood Movies

Former programming

References 
http://whatson.astro.com.my/channels/tara-hd/250/?cat=variety-entertainment&lang=multiple-language&stb=108
http://www.astroulagam.com.my/tags/9731/TARA-Hd
https://astrobyondinfo.weebly.com/home/tara-hd-to-be-launch-on-19-october-2016-replacing-zee-variasi

Television in Malaysia
Television channels and stations established in 2016
Television channels and stations disestablished in 2019